Chiung Yao or Qiong Yao (born 20 April 1938) is the pen name of Chen Che, a Taiwanese writer and producer who is often regarded as the most popular romance novelist in the Chinese-speaking world. Her novels have been adapted into more than 100 films and TV dramas.

Early life
Chen Che and her twin brother were born in 1938 during the Second Sino-Japanese War in Chengdu, Sichuan, to parents who had fled Beijing which had fallen to Japanese troops in 1937. Both her father Chen Zhiping and mother Yuan Xingshu were highly educated (Yuan's cousins include Yuan Xiaoyuan, Yuan Jing and Yuan Xingpei). In 1942, the family moved to Chen Zhiping's hometown of Hengyang, Hunan to join Chen Che's grandfather Chen Moxi. In 1944, following the fall of Hengyang, they survived an arduous journey to the wartime capital of Chongqing, during which they narrowly escaping death and rape several times.

In 1949, her family moved to Taiwan, where Chen attended the Affiliated Experimental Elementary School of University of Taipei (now ) and Taipei Municipal Zhongshan Girls High School. After failing the university entrance examination three times, she married writer Ma Senqing and became a housewife.

Career
When she was 18, Chiung Yao fell in love with her high school Chinese teacher. This experience became the basis of her debut novel Outside the Window, which became one of her most popular works and launched her career as a writer.

Chiung Yao's novels were first serialized in the Crown Magazine owned by Ping Hsin-tao and then published as monographs by Crown Publishing, also owned by Ping, who later became her second husband. The couple adapted many of her novels into television series and films, often serving as producers or screenwriters themselves. Film adaptations in the 1970s often featured Brigitte Lin, Joan Lin, Charlie Chin and/or Chin Han, who were then collectively known as the "Two Lins and Two Chins".

Her romance novels were very well received in Taiwan, and by the 1990s she was also one of the best-selling authors on mainland China. She has since been enormously popular throughout the Chinese-speaking world. Her biggest sellers are Outside the Window and Deep Is the Courtyard (1969), which have been repeatedly reprinted.

Her novels have been praised for the prose, the poetry which are part of her earlier works, and the literary allusions of their titles. They are often described as "morbid", as some of them feature socially-questionable romantic relationships (e.g. between teacher and student). Her romance novels and their film adaptions have been criticized for their melodramatic plotlines and long-winded dialogues. Chiung Yao's readership and viewership are predominantly female, owing to her emphasis on the feelings of young women.

Personal life
In 1959, Chiung Yao married Ma Senqing (馬森慶), also a writer. After she became famous and began to outshine her husband, their marriage broke down and ended in divorce in 1964.

In 1979, Chiung Yao married her publisher Ping Hsin-tao, who had had three children with his first wife Lin Wan-zhen. In 2018, Lin published a memoir in which she accused Chiung Yao of breaking up her marriage.

After Ping suffered a stroke and lost nearly all ability to communicate, Chiung Yao had a falling out with her step-children over whether to continue his intubation. Ping died on 23 May 2019, at the age of 92.

Lawsuit 
On 15 April 2014, Chiung Yao accused Chinese screenwriter and producer Yu Zheng of blatant plagiarism, seeking immediate suspension of the broadcast of his TV series Palace 3: The Lost Daughter, which she alleged to have plagiarized from her 1992 novel  (梅花烙). Yu denied the claim. On April 28, Chiung Yao filed a plagiarism lawsuit against Yu. On December 12, 109 Chinese screenwriters published a joint statement supporting Chiung Yao. A day later, an additional 30 Chinese screenwriters made their support of Chiung Yao known.

On 25 December, the court ruled in Chiung Yao's favor, ordering four companies to stop distributing and broadcasting The Palace: The Lost Daughter, also demanding Yu Zheng to publicly apologize and pay Chiung Yao RMB 5 million (around $800,000) in compensation. China Radio International called it a "landmark ruling".

List of works

References

External links
 Chiung Yao's official website
 琼瑶作品集  
 

Taiwanese women novelists
1938 births
Living people
Writers from Chengdu
20th-century Taiwanese women writers
21st-century Taiwanese women writers
Taiwanese television producers
Chinese television producers
Chinese film producers
Taiwanese film producers
Chinese twins
Taiwanese twins
Chinese lyricists
Taiwanese lyricists
Chinese women short story writers
Taiwanese women short story writers
Chinese women novelists
Taiwanese people from Sichuan
Women television producers
Republic of China short story writers
Short story writers from Sichuan
Second Sino-Japanese War refugees
Chinese Civil War refugees